The 2011 Shoot Out (officially the 2011 CaesarsCasino.com Snooker Shoot Out) was a professional non-ranking snooker tournament that took place between 28 and 30 January 2011 at the Circus Arena in Blackpool, England. It was played under a variation of the standard rules of snooker.

The event was last held in 1990, where Darren Morgan defeated Mike Hallett 2–1 in the final.

Nigel Bond won the final 1–0 (62–23) against Robert Milkins.

Prize fund

Winner: £32,000
Runner-up: £16,000
Semi-finals: £8,000
Quarter-finals: £4,000
Last 16: £2,000
Last 32: £1,000
Last 64: £500

Highest break: £2,000
Total: £130,000

Format and rules
It was a one frame shoot out with a random draw. 64 players contested the tournament, which was shown on Sky, the first time that Sky has shown a World Snooker event live since 2004. Frames were subject to a 20-second shot clock in the first five minutes and to a 15-second shot clock in the last 5 minutes. Clock started when the player had taken the cue ball. Players had to hit a cushion (with the cue ball OR the object ball) or pot a ball on every shot. Players  for who breaks and the winner decided. All foul resulted in ball in hand. After 10 minutes, the player with the most points won. If the score was tied, then a blue ball shoot out decided.

Draw
The draw for round 1 was made on 28 November 2010, just before the final of the Premier League. The draw for each round including the semi-finals was random, made just before the round began.

Main draw

Top half

Bottom half

Final

Century breaks
129, 113  Ronnie O'Sullivan
112  Mark King
106  Alfie Burden

References

External links
 Facebook: 28 January 2011
 Facebook: 29 January 2011 – Last 64
 Facebook: 29 January 2011 – Last 32
 Facebook: 30 January 2011 – Quarter-finals

2011
Snooker Shoot-Out
Snooker Shoot-Out
Sport in Blackpool